A modern language is any human language that is currently in use as a native language. The term is used in language education to distinguish between languages which are used for day-to-day communication (such as French and German) and dead classical languages such as Latin and Classical Chinese, which are studied for their cultural or linguistic value. SIL Ethnologue defines a living language as "one that has at least one speaker for whom it is their first language" (see also Language § Linguistic diversity).

The teaching of modern languages 

Modern languages are taught extensively around the world; see second language acquisition. English is taught as a second or foreign language in many countries; see English language learning and teaching.

Asia 
In Asia, most children learn an official version of their native language or learn a local major lingua franca (for example Mandarin, Hindustani) in Asia-Pacific countries, and all subjects are taught in that lingua franca language except for foreign language lessons. Singapore, in which English is taught as a first language, is an exception. In India, Hindi and English are used for official communication and are both compulsory languages to learn in many schools. Some students however also study other Indian languages along with English. English is the most-studied foreign language in the People's Republic of China, India, Pakistan, Japan, South Korea, Republic of China (Taiwan), Singapore and Hong Kong. In China, English is a required language starting in third grade, although the quality of instruction varies greatly. In Nepal, almost all subjects are taught in English, except for Nepali literature.

Pakistan 

In Pakistan, English has the status of an official language and is widely used within the government, by the civil service and the officer ranks of the military. Pakistan's Constitution and laws are written in English. It is also taught extensively in both public and private schools. Studying of English is compulsory in Pakistan along with Urdu (the national language and lingua franca of Pakistan). Regional languages of Pakistan are open to choice and a student is free to either pursue them or not. Nearly all schools, colleges and universities use English as the medium of instruction.

Malaysia 

In Malaysia, Malay and English are taught as compulsory languages from the first year of primary school with the exception of publicly funded vernacular schools (known as national type schools). In the latter, either Mandarin or Tamil are taught as additional compulsory languages. In non-vernacular schools, all subjects with the exception of the sciences and mathematics are taught in Malay. In vernacular schools, all subjects with the exception of the sciences and mathematics are taught in the primary language that is used in the respective schools. The sciences and mathematics are taught in English, although some Mandarin vernacular schools have dispensation to teach those subjects concurrently in Mandarin.

Sri Lanka 

In Sri Lanka, where the official state languages are Sinhalese, Tamil, and English, all government schools instruct either in Sinhala or Tamil. A few higher-level government schools (national-level schools) also offer instruction in English. All students studying in Sinhalese or Tamil are also taught English as a second language. All students studying in Sinhalese are also taught Tamil as a second language, and vice versa.

Middle East and North Africa 
Language study in the Middle East and North Africa varies from one country to another, usually depending on the foreign nation that colonized or occupied the country. For instance, in Algeria, Morocco, and Tunisia, French is the most widely studied language besides the native Arabic, while in Egypt and the Persian Gulf countries (such as the United Arab Emirates, Kuwait, and Oman), English is the main supplementary language. The teaching of languages other than Arabic, mainly English, is compulsory in all schools in southern and central Iraq and at all levels, being a requirement for graduation from school. In the Kurdistan Region (northern Iraq), the Palestinian Authority, Saudi Arabia, Syria, and Yemen, English is compulsory at all schools and all levels. In these countries, English and other foreign languages tend to be offered as subjects only in certain, wealthier schools. While Hebrew is the national language of Israel, English or Arabic are compulsory in elementary schools.

Egypt 
As Egypt's economy depends mainly on tourism, many modern languages are taught and spoken there. All children learn Arabic in school, but English is also mandatory beginning with the first grade (6 years of age). Another language is mandatory for the last two years of high school (17–18 years); French and German are the most commonly learned. There are also schools that specialize in particular languages. For instance, in French schools in Egypt students learn Arabic, French and then English later on. German schools in Egypt students learn Arabic, German and then English and probably some basic French as well.

European Union 
In all European Union school systems, it is mandatory to study at least one foreign language at some stage during the school career; there is a tendency for this to start earlier, even in the first year of primary school. Additional languages can be chosen as an optional subject. The most common foreign language chosen is increasingly English (the most popular first foreign language in 23 of the 25 member states of the European Union which do not have English as the language of instruction), followed by French and German. Some 90% of pupils learn English as a foreign language, whether the choice of language is obligatory or parental. Teaching is largely provided by generalist teachers in primary school and by specialists in middle and secondary schools. An exception to this is Ireland, where Irish Gaelic and English are the only mandatory languages, although the majority of students also study a modern language as it may be compulsory to do so at second level.

United Kingdom 
All children of the United Kingdom learn English at school. In Wales, all children at English language medium state schools learn Welsh as a second language until the age of 16, which is mainly taught through the medium of English. Welsh language schools teach mainly through the medium of Welsh.

In addition, Modern Foreign Languages is a compulsory component in the state education system. At least one language is studied until the end of Key Stage 3. Particular schools may require younger students to study additional languages, and they may be given the option to continue these. Schools are required to teach a program of languages according to local and national guidelines. From 2010, all primary school pupils in Key Stage 2 (aged 7 – 11) will be entitled to some teaching of a modern foreign language. English is taught to immigrant adults and youths as necessary.

Modern languages are studied in universities and colleges and various degrees are awarded in modern languages. The Modern Humanities Research Association was founded at Cambridge in 1918: after an early change of name to MHRA in 1918, the unincorporated charity became an incorporated company with the same name on 2 October 1997. Its declared aim is to encourage and promote advanced study and research in the field of the modern humanities, which include the modern and medieval European languages, literatures and cultures.

United States 
Although there is no official language of the United States, children learn American English as part of their institutional education. As the responsibility of K-12 education sits not with the U.S. Department of Education but with each individual state's State Education Agency (State Department of Education), some public school districts containing large numbers of English language learners (ELLs, notably students who speak Spanish, Chinese, and Navajo) offer bilingual education. This two-way setting uses the student's native language as well as English to impart curriculum, but the National Association for Bilingual Education notes it has been a controversial—and sometimes political—topic for a portion of citizens who advocate for English-only education. The U.S. also hosts many English as a Second Language (ESL) programs for people who have not learned English in school (most frequently immigrants to the U.S.).

As the global world economy makes knowledge of a world language a valuable work skill, a growing number of  elementary and middle school school districts now offer modern language courses, usually on an optional basis. Students are increasingly advised (and at times required) to study a foreign language in high school, and more frequently at the college or university level. In 2006, "the most commonly studied foreign language[s] in the U.S., determined by the number of students enrolled in foreign language classes in colleges and universities" were, in order of popularity: Spanish, French, German, American Sign Language, Italian, Japanese, Chinese, Latin, Russian, and Arabic.

Venezuela 
All children learn Spanish at school, but begin to learn English at the age of six in pre-school. In some other schools, like San Jose de Tarbes in Caracas, children begin to learn French and English when they are promoted from pre-school to middle school. And because of the growing number of Chinese immigrants, in certain areas of the country, there are also small schools for learning Chinese starting at the age of eight.

Auxiliary languages 
International auxiliary languages are by definition not associated with a particular country or geographic region. Esperanto is probably the best-known and most widespread. Interlingua, a much less popular, but still growing auxiliary language, is likewise spoken mainly in Northern and Eastern Europe and in South America, with substantial numbers of speakers in Central Europe, Ukraine, and Russia. Constructed languages from more recent years with sizable user communities are Klingon, Toki Pona and Interslavic.

See also 
Modern Language Association
Endangered language

References 

Languages by time
Language education